The Ramsay Memorial Chair of Chemical Engineering is a named professorship in the Department of Chemical Engineering at UCL, established along with the department and the Ramsay Memorial Laboratory in 1923. The current professor, Eva Sorensen is the 11th incumbent.

Ramsay Memorial Professors of Chemical Engineering 

 1923–1928 E. C. Williams
 1928–1935 William Edward Gibbs
 1934–1937 H. E. Watson
 1951–1965 M. B. Donald
 1965–1985 P. N. Rowe
 1985–1991 J. W. Mullin
 1991–1996 A. Cornish
 1996–2003 J. G. Yates
 2003–2012 A. G. Jones
 2012–2020 M. O. Coppens
 2021–present Eva Sorensen, 11th Ramsay Memorial Professor and first female Head of the Department of Chemical Engineering at UCL.

References

Chemical industry in the United Kingdom
Engineering education in the United Kingdom
Professorships in engineering
Professorships at University College London